Gabriele Nissim (born 1950) is an Italian journalist, historian and essayist whose works discuss Eastern Europe.

Biography

In 1982, Nissim founded L'Ottavo Giorno (The Eighth Day), an Italian magazine about the dissent in the Eastern European Countries.

He directed many documentaries for the TV networks of Canale 5 and of the Italian-speaking Switzerland on the underground opposition to Communism, the problems of post-Communism and on the condition of the Jews in the East.

He worked for the papers Panorama, Il Mondo, Il Giornale and the Corriere della Sera.

In 2001, Gabriele Nissim founded Gariwo, the Gardens of the Righteous Committee, which seeks for the Righteous of all genocides all over the world. In Milan, Gabriele Nissim created the Garden of the Righteous Worldwide together with the City Hall and the Union of the Italian Jewish Communities. 

He published “Ebrei invisibili. I sopravvissuti dell’Europa orientale dal comunismo ad oggi” (Invisible Jews. The Eastern European Holocaust survivors from the Communist era until today) with Gabriele Eschenazi for Mondadori in 1995. In 1998, he published “L’uomo che fermò Hitler. La storia di Dimitar Peshev che salvò gli ebrei di una nazione intera” (The man who stopped Hitler. The story of Dimitar Peshev who saved the Jews of a whole nation). In 2003, he published “Il tribunale del bene. La storia di Moshe Bejski, l’uomo che creò il Giardino dei Giusti” (The Tribunal of Good. The story of Moshe Bejski, the man who created the Garden of the Righteous).

For Bruno Mondadori, among with others, he wrote “Storie di uomini giusti nel Gulag” (Stories of righteous men inside the Gulag). His book “Una bambina contro Stalin” (A little girl against Stalin) tells about an Italian Communist expatriated into the USSR, then arrested and shot without a trial, and the battle of his daughter to get his memory rehabilitated.

During his remembrance-related activity, Gabriele Nissim has witnessed numerous international events.

He was one of the creators of the museum devoted to Peshev in Kustendil in Bulgaria in 2001, he promoted the creation of the Gardens of the Righteous Worldwide Committee in Milan, he created the first park dedicated to the victims of the gulag in the Valsesia Park of Milan in 2004 and he ushered in the memorial dedicated to the 1,000 Italian victims of the Soviet totaliarianism on 29 June 2007.

He has been the promoter of great international congresses about the Righteous. For his commitment on the Righteous subject he received numerous International recognitions.

On the 6 November 1998, the Sobranie (Sofia's Parliament) knighted him Sir of Madera, the highest cultural honor in Bulgaria, for discovering Dimitar Peshev, the saviour of the Bulgarian Jews. In 2003, he won the critics prize "Ilaria Alpi" for the TV documentary “Il giudice dei Giusti". 
On 2 December 2007, he received a special mention of the Lombardy Region for his peace activity and his activity about the Righteous. In 2014 Gabriele Nissim received “Ambrogino d’oro” from the city of Milan. In 2016, his book “La lettera a Hitler” won the international award “Montefiori” as historic novel of the year and the award “Fiuggi storia” within the biographies section. In 2016, he also received the certificate of merit from the Embassy of Armenia.

He has been the key figure in promoting the establishment of a European Day of the Righteous, which was approved by the European Parliament on 10 May 2012. It will take place yearly on 6 March to remember all men and women who have stood up against totalitarianism and genocides. This recurrence has become a civil feast in Italy (Giornata dei Giusti dell’umanità) after the definitive approval of its constitutive law on 7 December 2017.

Bibliography 

 Ebrei invisibili: I sopravvissuti dell'Europa orientale dal comunismo a oggi (with Gabriele Eschenazi), Mondadori, 1995, 
 Storie di uomini Giusti nel gulag , AA.VV., introduction by Gabriele Nissim, Bruno Mondadori, 2000, 
 L'uomo che fermò Hitler, Mondadori, 2001, 
 Il tribunale del bene, Mondadori, 2003, 
 Una bambina contro Stalin, Mondadori, 2007, 
 La bontà insensata. Il segreto degli uomini giusti, Collana Saggi, Milano, Mondadori, 2011, .
 La lettera a Hitler. Storia di Armin T. Wegner, combattente solitario contro i genocidi del Novecento, Collezione Le Scie, Milano, Mondadori, 2015, .
 Il bene possibile. Essere giusti nel proprio tempo, Novara, Utet, 2018, .
 Auschwitz non finisce mai. La memoria della Shoah e i nuovi genocidi. Milano, Rizzoli, 2022, .

Honours

References

Sources 
 Gabriele Nissim on Haaretz
 Gabriele Nissim on Grandi e Associati
 Gabriele Nissim and the stories of the "normal heroes"
 Gabriele Nissim on Wikio
 Gabriele Nissim receives the 2007 Peace Award of the Lombardy region. In the photograph he ushers in the Garden of the Righteous in Milan
 All books by Gabriele Nissim on BOL.it
 Gabriele Nissim honoring Dimitar Peshev in Sofia

External links
Gardens of the Righteous Worldwide - Gariwo
www.zam.it
www.grandieassociati.it

Italian journalists
Italian male journalists
Living people
1950 births